The Soviet Union's 1969 nuclear test series was a group of 19 nuclear tests conducted in 1969. These tests  followed the 1968 Soviet nuclear tests series and preceded the 1970 Soviet nuclear tests series.

References

1969
1969 in the Soviet Union
1969 in military history
Explosions in 1969